The Embassy of Turkey in Paris (Turkish: Türkiye'nin Paris Büyükelçiliği) is the diplomatic mission of Turkey in France. It is located on 16 Avenue de Lamballe, Paris.

History
During the Ottoman Empire period, special representatives were sent to the Kingdom of France starting at year 1483, within the framework of the alliance established between Francis I of France and Suleiman the Magnificent in 1536, France opened an embassy in Istanbul in 1536.

Yirmisekiz Çelebi Mehmet Efendi was the first long-term Ambassador to France by the Ottoman Empire. Çelebi Mehmet Efendi, who was sent to France in 1720, prepared a comprehensive report on the country and remained in France until 1722.

Accreditation
The embassy is accredited to Monaco.

References

Paris
Turkey
France–Turkey relations